Sutter, Illinois may refer to:
Sutter, Hancock County, Illinois, an unincorporated community in Hancock County
Sutter, Tazewell County, Illinois, an unincorporated community in Tazewell County